Albert motorcycles were manufactured in Germany between 1922 and 1924. They featured 183cc two-stroke engines.

References

Motorcycle manufacturers of Germany